Gustavo Kuerten and Fernando Meligeni were the defending champions, but Kuerten did not participate this year.  Meligeni partnered Luis Lobo, losing in the quarterfinals.

Hendrik Jan Davids and Andrew Kratzmann won the title, defeating Julián Alonso and Nicolás Lapentti 7–6, 5–7, 6–4 in the final.

Seeds

  Donald Johnson /  Francisco Montana (first round)
  Luis Lobo /  Fernando Meligeni (quarterfinals)
  Lucas Arnold /  Daniel Orsanic (semifinals)
  Hendrik Jan Davids /  Andrew Kratzmann (champions)

Draw

Draw

References
Draw

Chile Open (tennis)
1997 ATP Tour